Louise Colet (15 August 1810 – 9 March 1876), born Louise Revoil de Servannes,  was a French poet and writer.

Life and works
She was born at the hôtel d'Antoine (fr) in Aix-en-Provence in France. In her twenties she married Hippolyte Colet, an academic musician, partly in order to escape provincial life and live in Paris.

Upon arrival in Paris, Colet began to submit her work for approval and publication and soon won a two-thousand-franc prize from the Académie française, the first of four prizes won from the Académie.  At her salon participated many of her contemporaries in the Parisian literary community, such as Victor Hugo.

In 1840, she gave birth to her daughter Henriette, but neither her husband nor her lover, Victor Cousin, would acknowledge paternity.  Later she became the paramour of Gustave Flaubert, Alfred de Musset, and Abel Villemain.  After her husband died, Colet supported herself and her daughter with her writing.

Her brother was the painter Pierre Révoil. Louise Colet died in Paris.

Though married to Hippolyte Colet, Louise had a steamy eight-year affair, in two stages, with Gustave Flaubert.  The relationship turned sour, however, and they broke up.  Louise was allegedly so angered by her breakup with Flaubert, she wrote a novel, Lui, in an effort to target Flaubert. However, Colet's book has failed to have the lasting significance of Flaubert's 1857 novel Madame Bovary. Flaubert's dozens of long letters to her, in 1846–1847, then especially between 1851 and 1855, are one of the many joys of his correspondence. Many of them are a precious source of information on the progress of the writing of Madame Bovary. In many others, Flaubert gives lengthy appreciations and critical comments on the poems that Louise Colet sent to him for his judgment before offering them for publication. The most interesting of these comments show the vast differences between her and him on the matter of style and literary expression, her being a gushing Romanticist, whereas he was deeply convinced that the writer must abstain from gush and self-indulgence.

Selected works 
Fleurs du midi (1836)
Penserosa (1839) 
La Jeunesse de Goethe (1839) 
Les Funérailles de Napoléon (1840) 
La Jeunesse de Mirabeau (1841)
Les Coeurs brisés (1843) 
Lui (1859)
Enfances Célèbres (1865)

Further reading 
Francine du Plessix Gray: Rage and Fire: Life of Louise Colet - Pioneer Feminist, Literary Star, Flaubert's Muse, Simon & Schuster 1994,

External links 
 
 
 

Texts online (in French)
L'Institutrice (1840)
Qui est-elle ? (1842)
Diane, fragment d'un roman inédit (ca 1850) 
Enfances célèbres (1865)

1810 births
1876 deaths
writers from Aix-en-Provence
French women poets
Writers from Provence-Alpes-Côte d'Azur
19th-century French poets
19th-century French women writers
French salon-holders